Ahitophel or Ahithophel ( ʾĂḥīṯōp̄el) was a counselor of King David and a man greatly renowned for his sagacity. During Absalom's revolt he deserted David (Psalm 41:9; 55:12–14) and supported Absalom (2 Samuel 15:12). Absalom had sought the advice of Ahitophel who advised Absalom to have relations with his father's concubines in order to show all Israel how odious he was to his father [2 Samuel 16:20]. David sent his friend Hushai back to Absalom, in order to counteract the counsel of Ahitophel (2 Samuel 15:31–37). Ahitophel had recommended an immediate attack on David's camp at a point where he was weary and vulnerable in order to kill David (2 Samuel 17:1-2), whereas Hushai suggested that "the advice that Ahithophel has given is not good at this time" (2 Samuel 17:7) and recommended delay while a larger army was assembled to counter David's alleged strength (2 Samuel 17:11-13). Hushai's advice was accepted "for the LORD had ordained to defeat the good advice of Ahithophel, so that the LORD might bring ruin on Absalom" (2 Samuel 17:14). Seeing that his good advice against David had not been followed due to Hushai's influence, Ahithophel apparently surmised that the revolt would fail. He then left the camp of Absalom at once. He returned to Giloh, his native place, and after arranging his worldly affairs, hanged himself, and was buried in the sepulcher of his fathers (2 Samuel 17:23). His son Eliam is listed among David's 30 warriors [2 Samuel 23.34]

A man named Ahitophel is also mentioned in 2 Samuel 23:34, and he is said to be the father of Eliam. Since 2 Samuel 11:3 notes that Eliam is the father of Bathsheba, some scholars suggest that the Ahitophel of 2 Samuel 15 may in fact be Bathsheba's grandfather. Levenson and Halpern, for example, note that "the narrator is sufficiently subtle (or guileless) to have Bathsheba's grandfather ... instigate the exaction of YHWH's pound of flesh," as Nathan's curse in 2 Samuel 12:11 comes to fruition.

In Rabbinical literature

The Talmud speaks of this counsellor of David as "a man, like Balaam, whose great wisdom was not received in humility as a gift from heaven, and so became a stumbling-block to him". He was "one of those who, while casting longing eyes upon things not belonging to them, lose also the things they possess". Accordingly, Ahithophel was granted access by Almighty God into the Divine powers of the Holy Name (YHWH). And being thus familiar with Divine wisdom and knowledge as imparted through the Holy Spirit, he was consulted as an oracle like the Urim and Thummim. "..and great as was his wisdom, it was equalled by his scholarship. Therefore David did not hesitate to submit himself to his instruction, even though Ahithophel was a very young
man, at the time of his death not more than thirty-three years old. The one thing lacking in him was sincere piety, and this it was that proved his undoing in the end, for it induced him to take part in Absalom's rebellion against David. Thus he forfeited even his share in the world to come. 
To this dire course of action he was misled by astrologic and other signs, which he interpreted as prophecies of his own kingship, when in reality they pointed to the royal destiny of his granddaughter Bath-sheba. Possessed by his erroneous belief, he cunningly urged Absalom to commit an unheard-of crime. Thus Absalom would profit nothing by his rebellion, for, though he accomplished his father's ruin, he would yet be held to account and condemned to death for his violation of family purity, and the way to the throne would be clear for Ahithophel, the great sage in Israel." But he withheld his mystic knowledge from King David in the hour of peril, and was therefore doomed to die from strangulation. "Ahitophel of the house of Israel and Balaam of the heathen nations were the two great sages of the world who, failing to show gratitude to God for their wisdom, perished in dishonor. To them the prophetic word finds application: 'Let not the wise man glory in his wisdom,' (Jeremiah 9:23)."

It is also said that David, during his reign, had many disagreeable encounters with Ahithophel. Shortly after his accession the king seems to have overlooked Ahithophel in his appointments of judges and other officials. Consequently, when David was in despair concerning the visitation upon Uzzah during the attempted transport of the ark (2 Samuel 6:6; see Uzzah) and sought counsel of Ahithophel, the latter mockingly suggested to him that he had better apply to his own wise men. Only upon David's malediction, that whoever knew a remedy and concealed it should surely end by committing suicide, did Ahithophel offer him some rather vague advice, concealing the true solution, which was that the ark must be carried on the shoulders of men instead of upon a wagon.

Curse upon Ahithophel

Ahithophel rendered a service to David upon another occasion; not, however, until he had been again threatened with the curse. It appears that David excavated too deeply for the foundations of the Temple, with the result that earth's deepest floods broke forth, and nearly inundated the earth. None could help but Ahithophel, who withheld his counsel in the hope of seeing David borne away upon the flood. When David again warned him of the malediction, Ahithophel counseled the king to throw a tile, with the ineffable name of God written upon it, into the cavity; whereupon the waters began to sink. Ahithophel is said to have defended his use of the name of God in this emergency by reference to the practice enjoined by Scripture (Numbers 5:23) to restore marital harmony; surely a matter of small importance, he argued, compared with the threatened destruction of the world.  David's repeated malediction that Ahithophel would be hanged was finally realized when the latter hanged himself.

Ahithophel's death was a great loss to David; for his wisdom was so great that Scripture itself (2 Samuel 16:23) avoids calling him a man alikening him to an angel; in the passage quoted the Hebrew word for man is omitted in the text, being supplied only by the Masorah. (The preceding statement is incorrect because the word for "man" in 2 Samuel 16:23 refers to one who asks at the word of God and not to Ahithophel. Thus its absence does not imply anything about Ahithophel.) Indeed, his wisdom bordered on that of the angels. His learning in the Law was also extensive, so that David did not scruple to call him "master"; the two things which David is there said to have learned from Ahithophel are more closely described in Masechet Kallah. Ahithophel's disposition, however, was a jealous one; and he always sought to wound David by mocking remarks. His devotion to the study of the Law was not founded on worthy motives. Ahithophel was thirty-three years old when he died. In his will he left warning to his children to  1. Refrain from doing aught against a favorite of fortune. 2. Take heed not to rise up against the royal house of David and to take no part in their dissensions 3. If the Feast of Pentecost falls on a sunny day, then sow wheat. Posterity has been favored with the knowledge of but a small part of Ahithophel's wisdom, and that little through two widely different sources, through Socrates, who was his disciple, and through a fortune-book written by him. Ahithophel is counted among those that have no share in the world to come.

In Christian interpretation
Christian interpreters often see Judas Iscariot as an antitype to Ahithophel. Alexander Kirkpatrick, in the Cambridge Bible for Schools and Colleges, calls his suicide "the first deliberate suicide on record".

Ahithophel's betrayal of David, and subsequent suicide are seen as anticipating Judas' betrayal of Jesus, and the gospels' account of Judas hanging himself (Matthew 27:5). Psalm 41:9, which seems to refer to Ahithophel, is quoted in John 13:18 as being fulfilled in Judas.

References

Attributions

Israeli politicians who committed suicide
Suicides by hanging in Israel
People associated with David
Ancient people who committed suicide
Year of birth unknown
Year of death unknown